Xiran Jay Zhao is a Chinese-born Canadian author, Internet personality, and cosplayer. Their debut novel, Iron Widow, became a  1 New York Times Best Seller and won the 2021 BSFA Award for Best Book for Younger Readers.

Early life
Zhao immigrated to British Columbia from a small town in China in grade five. They are of Hui heritage on their father's side. They would imagine stories growing up, but did not put any on paper until they were encouraged to at an anime convention when they were 15. They majored in health sciences with a focus on biochemical disease research at Simon Fraser University, graduating in 2020. They worked at a co-op before deciding an office job was not for them.

Career
In March 2020, Zhao signed a two-book deal with Penguin Teen Canada for a young adult (YA) mecha reimagining of the rise of the Chinese Empress Wu. Rock the Boat, the children's imprint of Oneworld Publications, acquired the UK rights in May 2021. Zhao described the series as a "monstrous amalgamation of my love for anime and my love for Chinese harem dramas". The first installment in the series, Iron Widow, was published in September 2021 and reached  1 in the Young Adult Hardcover category of the New York Times Best Seller list. The second installment in the series, Iron Widow 2: Heavenly Tyrant, is scheduled for release in April 2024.

In September 2020, Zhao went viral, first on a Twitter thread followed by their first YouTube video, for their criticisms of Disney's live-action Mulan remake and its cultural inaccuracies. Zhao credits their presence on the Internet as a self-described "Chinese history memer" for the success of Iron Widow, which was initially expected to only appeal to a niche audience. Jessica Singer, for CBC News in August 2021, highlighted the impact of BookTok on sales of young adult fiction. Singer wrote that "books like Iron Widow by Canadian author Xiran Jay Zhao are already gaining popularity online, even before the book's release date in late September". Kara Savoy, Penguin Random House Canada's integrated marketing director, told Singer that "when Xiran did an unboxing video of their advanced copies a few weeks ago [on TikTok], the pre-sale numbers in the U.S. went up 600 per cent that week".

At the beginning of 2021, Zhao landed their second book deal for Zachary Ying and the Dragon Emperor, a middle grade contemporary fantasy with Margaret K. McElderry Books, an imprint of Simon & Schuster. It was released on 10 May 2022. The novel debuted at #4 on the New York Times Best Seller list in the Children's Middle Grade Hardcover category; it remained on the list for two weeks. Alec Scott, for The Globe and Mail, compared Zachary Ying to Zhao's Iron Widow and commented that "the two books speak to Zhao's obsessions – both with anime, the visual storytelling popularized in Japan that's gone global, and with Chinese history and mythology. [...] In both novels, the mythic past gets translated into the future. [...] For all their differences of mood, the novels rescue what is valuable to Zhao in Chinese history and myth, and project it forward – creating artistic acts of cultural reappropriation".

Awards and nominations

Bibliography

Young adult
 
  (upcoming)

Middle grade

Notes

References

External links
 

Living people
21st-century Canadian novelists
21st-century Chinese novelists
Canadian LGBT novelists
Canadian speculative fiction writers
Canadian writers of young adult literature
Canadian YouTubers
Chinese emigrants to Canada
Chinese Internet celebrities
Chinese speculative fiction writers
Cosplayers
Hui people
Chinese LGBT novelists
LGBT YouTubers
Canadian non-binary writers
Chinese non-binary people
Simon Fraser University alumni
Writers from British Columbia
Year of birth missing (living people)
Canadian writers of Asian descent
Non-binary novelists
21st-century Canadian LGBT people